No. 639 Squadron RAF was an anti aircraft co-operation squadron of the Royal Air Force from 1943 to 1945.

History
The squadron was formed at RAF Cleave on 1 December 1943, from 1602 Flight, 1603 Flight, 1604 Flight and 1618 Flight for anti-aircraft co-operation duties with the Hawker Henley. The main role was to provide target towing duties over Cornwall. In addition the Hawker Hurricane was used as a radar target and to fly low-level simulated attacks on troops. The squadron was disbanded on 30 April 1945.

Aircraft operated

Squadron bases

See also
List of Royal Air Force aircraft squadrons

References

Notes

Bibliography

External links
 History of No. 639 Squadron
 Nos. 621–650 Squadron Histories on RAFweb

No. 639 Squadron
Military units and formations established in 1943
Military units and formations disestablished in 1945